Douzhi (also called mung bean milk) is a fermented dish from Beijing cuisine. It is similar to soy milk, but made from mung beans. It is a by-product of cellophane noodle production. It is generally slightly sour, with an egg-like smell.

References

Beijing cuisine
Plant milk
Legume dishes